The Augusta Subdivision is a railroad line owned by CSX Transportation in the U.S. states of Georgia and South Carolina. At its north end it continues south from the McCormick Subdivision and at its south end it continues south as the Charleston Subdivision.

See also
 List of CSX Transportation lines
 Port Royal and Augusta Railway

References

CSX Transportation lines
Rail infrastructure in Georgia (U.S. state)
Rail infrastructure in South Carolina